George Stowers (born 14 February 1979) is a Samoan international rugby union player.  He plays as a Flanker or a No.8.

Club career
In 2002, Stowers signed for World after his international career began to take route. In 2009, Stowers signed for London Irish.

International career
Stowers made his debut in 2001 against Ireland but had to wait till 2008 for his next cap, which came in the 2008 IRB Pacific Nations Cup against Fiji in a 34–17 loss, he was a mainstay for that tournament and hopes to build on this international success by joining international team mates Sailosi Tagicakibau and Seilala Mapasua at Guinness Premiership club, London Irish.

References

External links
 
 Manu Samoa supporters website
 Pacific Islanders Rugby Teams supporters website

1979 births
Living people
Samoan rugby union players
Rugby union flankers
Samoa international rugby union players
Pacific Islanders rugby union players
Samoan expatriate rugby union players
Expatriate rugby union players in Wales
Expatriate rugby union players in England
Samoan expatriate sportspeople in England
Samoan expatriate sportspeople in Wales
Expatriate rugby union players in Japan
Samoan expatriate sportspeople in Japan
Counties Manukau rugby union players
Tasman rugby union players
Sportspeople from Apia
People educated at Wesley College, Auckland
London Irish players
Kobelco Kobe Steelers players
Ospreys (rugby union) players